Alofau (Samoan: Ālōfau) is a village on the southeast coast of Tutuila Island, American Samoa. It is located at the eastern end of Faga'itua Bay, six miles east of Pago Pago, between Pagai and Amouli. It is home to Alofau Village Marine Protected Area. It is an agrarian and traditional village. It is also a poor village with residents with low literacy and high unemployment rates. As of the U.S. Census 2000, the per capita income was $4,357 and 67 percent of children were below the poverty line. 15.6 percent of residents were receiving public assistance. It is lauded as a kava place in the Manu'a Songs. Alofau is located in Sa'Ole County.

Alofau Volcano is a major named volcano on Tutuila Island, although it is sometimes regarded as part of Pago Volcano.

Great surfing conditions can be found in Faga'itua Bay near Alofau.

An Adventist congregation had been established in the village by 1956.

Geology
Alofau Volcano consists of thin-bedded aa and pāhoehoe flows, breccias, dikes, and tuffs exposed in a shield-shaped dome. The volcanic dome covers around 2,4 km2. on the east side of Faga'itua Bay. The volcano is built over a rift zone trending northeast–southwest. The lava flows are thinly bedded primitive olivine basalts, dipping 10-20 degrees away from Alofau village. A dike complex is exposed on the road southeast of Fagaitua village, while another 130 dikes are exposed in a promontory on the north side of Alofau. Large numbers of dikes are also seen south of Alofau village.

Demographics

See also
Alofau Village Marine Protected Area

References

Villages in American Samoa